The Petit lac Malbaie is a freshwater body of the unorganized territory of Lac-Pikauba, in the Charlevoix Regional County Municipality, in the administrative region of Capitale-Nationale, in the province of Quebec, in Canada. This lake, which is located in a forest and mountainous area, is part of the zec des Martres, that is to the northeast of Grands-Jardins National Park.

The southern part of Petit lac Malbaie is accessible by a forest road from the south. This mountain lake is entirely located in an area where forestry has always been the predominant economic activity; recreational tourism, second. In the middle of 19th century, recreational tourism activities took off.

Due to the altitude, this lake is normally frozen from mid-November to the end of April; however, the safe ice traffic period is usually from early December to mid-April.

Geography 
Petit lac Malbaie is mainly fed by the outlet (coming from the east) of the First and Second Lac Landry, as well as the outlet (coming from the northwest) from Lac Claire and Lac du Bec-Croisé.

The main hydrographic slopes neighboring Petit Lac Malbaie are:
 to the east: Lac des Cavernes, Second Lac Laury;
 to the south: Lac de la Baie;
 to the west: Lac Gilbert, Lac Équerre, Petite rivière Malbaie, Malbaie River;
 north: Lac Barley, Lac Lesclache.

The mouth of Petit lac Malbaie is located to the southwest. From there, the current descends on  following the course of the Malbaie river which flows to La Malbaie in the St. Lawrence River.

Toponymy 
This toponymic designation appears on the draft of the Lac des Martres map, 1961-09-25, item 67. This denomination was approved on 1963-07-03 by the Commission de géographie du Québec.

The toponym "Petit lac Malbaie" was formalized on December 5, 1968, at the Place Names Bank of the Commission de toponymie du Québec.

See also 

 Charlevoix Regional County Municipality
 Lac-Pikauba, an unorganized territory
 Zec des Martres, a controlled exploitation zone
 Petite rivière Malbaie
 Malbaie River

References 

Lakes of Capitale-Nationale
Charlevoix Regional County Municipality